The Himalia group is a group of prograde irregular satellites of Jupiter that follow similar orbits to Himalia and are thought to have a common origin.

The known members of the group are (in order of increasing distance from Jupiter):

Two additional possible satellites discovered by Sheppard in 2017 have been identified to be likely part of the Himalia group, but were too faint (mag >24) to be tracked and confirmed as satellites.

The International Astronomical Union (IAU) reserves names for moons of Jupiter ending in -a (Leda, Himalia and so on) for the moons in this group to indicate prograde motions of these bodies relative to Jupiter, their gravitationally central object.

Characteristics and origin

The objects in the Himalia group have semi-major axes (distances from Jupiter) in the range of 11.15 and 11.75 Gm, inclinations between 26.6° and 28.3°, and eccentricities of between 0.11 and 0.25. All orbit prograde. 
In physical appearance, the group is very homogenous, all satellites displaying neutral colours (colour indices B−V = 0.66 and V−R = 0.36) similar to those of C-type asteroids. Given the limited dispersion of the orbital parameters and the spectral homogeneity, it has been suggested that the group could be a remnant of the break-up of an asteroid from the  main asteroid belt. The radius of the parent asteroid was probably about 89 km, only slightly larger than that of Himalia, which retains approximately 87% of the mass of the original body. This indicates the asteroid was not heavily disturbed.

Numerical integrations show a high probability of collisions among the members of the prograde group during the lifespan of the solar system (e.g.  on average 1.5 collisions between Himalia and Elara). In addition, the same simulations have shown fairly high probabilities of collisions between prograde and retrograde satellites (e.g. Pasiphae and Himalia have a 27% probability of collision within 4.5 gigayears). Consequently, it has been suggested that the current group could be a result of a more recent, rich collisional history among the prograde and retrograde satellites as opposed to the single break-up shortly after the planet formation that has been inferred for the Carme and Ananke groups.

References

 
Moons of Jupiter
Irregular satellites
Moons with a prograde orbit